Russell Menard, Emeritus Professor at the University of Minnesota specializes in the economic and social history of the British colonies in North America.  He earned his Ph.D. at the University of Iowa in 1975. Most of his work has been on the economic, demographic, and social history of the Chesapeake region during the early colonial period, but his research interests include the origins of plantation slavery in British America, the economic development of the Lower South in the 18th century, and late 19th-century U.S. social history. Most recently, he has been doing work on the West Indies.  

Menard taught undergraduate and graduate courses on early American history, economic history, and the history of slavery.

Menard presented with a panel of other scholars at the 100th OAH Annual Meeting in Minneapolis, Minnesota. He and the other scholars presented papers on the "State of the Field: Early American Economic History"

For years Menard was a key member in the University of Minnesota's Early American History Workshop. Workshop participants represented many disciplines: history, American Studies, economics, demography, literature, religious studies, public policy, and women's studies. Papers covered a wide temporal sweep from the colonial period to the American Civil War and a broad geographical and spatial scope encompassing the histories of Canada, New England, the Middle Atlantic, the Lower South, the West Indies, Latin America, slavery, and native people.

Books

 Robert Cole's World: Agriculture and Society in Early Maryland 
 Migrants, Servants and Slaves: Unfree Labor in Colonial British America 
 With John J. McCusker, The Economy of British America, 1607-1789
 Sweet Negotiations: Sugar, Slavery, And Plantation Agriculture in Early Barbados

Notes

Living people
University of Minnesota faculty
1942 births